Mauro "Blond Herring" or "Goose" Gozzo (born March 7, 1966) is an American former Major League Baseball pitcher and current manager of the Gastonia Honey Hunters. He played all or parts of six seasons in the majors, from  until .

Career

Playing
He was selected in the 13th round of the 1984 Major League Baseball Draft by the New York Mets, and was traded to the Kansas City Royals in 1987 as part of the package for David Cone. Two seasons later, he was selected by the Toronto Blue Jays in the minor league draft, and he debuted in the majors for the Jays on August 8, 1989. After his rookie season, Gozzo played two years for the Cleveland Indians and one for the Minnesota Twins. During his two games with the Twins, he had a blond mustache with brown hair, earning him the nickname of Blond Herring. He played his final two seasons for the Mets, playing his final game on August 11, 1994. (That was the last day of the 1994 season.  The players' strike began the next day, and continued into 1995.

Coaching
Gozzo  served as the director of the Goose's Gamers AAU baseball league in 2010. In 2018, Gozzo served as the pitching coach for the New Britain Bees of the Atlantic League of Professional Baseball. He was promoted to manager for the 2019 season following Wally Backman's departure. In 2020, he became pitching coach under manager Wally Backman for the Long Island Ducks.

On February 18, 2021, Gozzo was announced as manager of the new Gastonia Honey Hunters franchise in the Atlantic League of Professional Baseball.

Personal life
Gozzo was born in New Britain, Connecticut and graduated from Berlin High School, he moved to Wallingford, Connecticut after his playing career ended. Gozzo has twin sons, Paul and Sal both of whom have played college baseball.

References

Sources

1966 births
Living people
American expatriate baseball players in Canada
Baseball coaches from Connecticut
Baseball players from Connecticut
Cleveland Indians players
Columbia Mets players
Colorado Springs Sky Sox players
Iowa Cubs players
Knoxville Blue Jays players
Little Falls Mets players
Lynchburg Mets players
Major League Baseball pitchers
Memphis Chicks players
Minnesota Twins players
New York Mets players
Norfolk Tides players
Portland Beavers players
Sportspeople from New Britain, Connecticut
Syracuse Chiefs players
Toronto Blue Jays players
New Britain Bees